Michael Dennis Peck (born 26 March 2001) is a professional footballer who plays for the Missouri State Bears as a defender.

Career
Peck made his professional debut on 13 November 2018 in a 2–0 EFL Trophy defeat between Argyle and EFL League Two side Newport County. In November 2019 he joined Dorchester Town on loan, and in December 2019 he joined Tiverton Town on a months loan deal. The deal was later extended for another 28 days and later to the end of the season.

Following his release by Plymouth Argyle in summer 2020, he joined Tiverton Town permanently for a season, before joining Missouri State University's soccer team, the Missouri State Bears, in 2021.

Career statistics

References

Living people
2001 births
English footballers
Plymouth Argyle F.C. players
Dorchester Town F.C. players
Tiverton Town F.C. players
Association football defenders
People from Bodmin
Footballers from Cornwall
Missouri State Bears soccer players
College men's soccer players in the United States